{{Automatic taxobox 
| image = Snubnose brotula.jpg
| image_caption = Armored Cusk (H. armata)
| taxon = Hoplobrotula
| authority = Gill, 1863
| type_species = Brotula armata
| type_species_authority = Temminck & Schlegel, 1846<ref name = CoF>{{Cof record|genid=3224|title=Hoplobtotula|access-date=13 July 2018}}</ref>
}}Hoplobrotula is a genus of cusk-eels.

Species
There are currently three recognized species in this genus:
 Hoplobrotula armata (Temminck & Schlegel, 1846) (Armored cusk)
 Hoplobrotula badia Machida, 1990
 Hoplobrotula gnathopus'' (Regan, 1921) (False kinglip)

References

Ophidiidae